A robotaxi, also known as robo-taxi, self-driving taxi or driverless taxi, is an autonomous car (SAE automation level 4 or 5) operated for a ridesharing company.

Some studies have hypothesized that robotaxis operated in an autonomous mobility on demand (AMoD) service could be one of the most rapidly adopted applications of autonomous cars at scale and a major mobility solution in the near future, especially in urban areas, providing the majority of vehicle miles in the United States within a decade of their first introduction. Moreover, they could have a very positive impact on road safety, traffic congestion and parking. Robotaxis could also reduce pollution and consumption of energy, since these services will most probably use electric cars and for most of the rides, less vehicle size and range is necessary compared to individually owned vehicles. The expectable reduction of the number of vehicles means less embodied energy, however energy consumption for redistribution of empty vehicles must be taken into account. Robotaxis would reduce operating costs by eliminating the need for a human driver, which might make it an affordable form of transportation and increase the popularity of transportation-as-a-service (TaaS) as opposed to individual car ownership. However, such developments could lead to job destruction and new challenges concerning operator liabilities.

Predictions of the widespread and rapid introduction of robo-taxis – by as early as 2018 – have not been realized. There are a number of pilot trials underway in cities around the world, some of which are in revenue service and open to the public. However, questions have been raised as to whether the progress of self-driving technology has stalled and whether issues of social acceptance, cybersecurity and cost have been addressed.

Current status

Vehicle costs 
So far all the trials have involved specially modified passenger cars with space for two or four passengers sitting in the back seats behind a partition. LIDAR, cameras and other sensors have been used on all vehicles. The cost of early vehicles has been estimated at up to $300,000 due to custom manufacture and specialized sensors. However, the prices of some components such as the LIDAR has fallen by up to 90%. Volume production may see the cost fall further and Baidu announced in June 2021 it would start producing robotaxi for 500,000 yuan (US$77,665) each. Waymo has estimated its hardware costs at $0.30 per mile (~$0.19 per km), but this excludes the cost of fleet technicians and customer support.

Passenger tests 
Several companies are testing robotaxi services, especially in the United States and in China. All tests so far only operate in a geo-fenced area. Service areas for robotaxis, often dubbed the Objective Design Domain (ODD) by the industry, are specially designated zones where robotaxis can safely provide service.

In early tests there were one or two "safety drivers" or "safety engineers" to take control back in case of emergency. Early tests offered free rides and were restricted to company employees or pre-approved passengers.   Further development has led to testing without a safety drivers in the vehicles although some trials resume the use of drivers under inclement weather such as rain. Vehicles may also be manually driven if a vehicle is becomes "paralysed" by a situation out of which it cannot manoeuvre automatically. In these cases either a support driver is brought to the vehicle or the car is operated remotely.  Revenue service for the general public has been introduced in a number of trials.

Separate to these efforts have been trials of shared autonomous vehicles with larger vehicles on fixed routes with designated stops, able to carry between 6 and 10 passengers. Most of these shuttle buses operate a low speeds although recently a number of vehicles capable of highway speeds have been revealed including the Zoox and the Cruise Origin.

Taxi license 
In February 2018 in Arizona, the state has granted Waymo a Transportation Network Company permit.

In February 2022 in California, The California Public Utilities Commission (CPUC) issued Drivered Deployment permits to Cruise and Waymo to allow for passenger service in autonomous vehicles with a safety driver present in the vehicle. These carriers must hold a valid California Department of Motor Vehicles (DMV) Deployment permit and meet the requirements of the CPUC Drivered Deployment program.
And in June 2022, Cruise has scored final approvals to operate a commercial robotaxi service in San Francisco.

In April 2022, Chinese companies Baidu and Pony.ai received permits to deploy robotaxis without humans in the driver seat on open roads within a 23 square mile area in the Beijing Economic-Technological Development Area, and it was the first time in their home country.

History

First trials 
In August 2016, MIT spinoff NuTonomy was the first company to make robotaxis available to the public, starting to offer rides with a fleet of 6 modified Renault Zoes and Mitsubishi i-MiEVs in a limited area in Singapore. NuTonomy later signed three significant partnerships to develop its robotaxi service: with Grab, Uber’s rival in Southeast Asia, with Groupe PSA, which is supposed to provide the company with Peugeot 3008 SUVs and the last one with Lyft to launch a robotaxi service in Boston.

In August 2017, Cruise Automation, a self-driving startup acquired by General Motors in 2016, launched the beta version of a robotaxi service for its employees in San Francisco using a fleet of 46 Chevrolet Bolt EVs.

Testing and revenue service timeline 
  Trials listed have a safety driver unless otherwise indicated. The commencement of a trial does not mean it is still active.
 August 2016 - NuTonomy launched its autonomous taxi service using a fleet of 6 modified Renault Zoes and Mitsubishi i-MiEVs in Singapore
 September 2016 - Uber started allowing a select group of users in Pittsburgh to order robotaxis from a fleet of 14 vehicles. Two Uber engineers were always in the front seats of each vehicle.
 March 2017 - An Uber self-driving car was hit and flipped on its side by another vehicle that failed to yield. In October 2017, Uber started using only one test driver.
 April 2017 - Waymo started a large scale robotaxi tests in a geo-fenced suburb of Phoenix, Arizona with a driver monitoring each vehicle. The service area was about   In November 2017 some testing without drivers began. Commercial operations began in November 2019.
 August 2017 - Cruise Automation launched the beta version robotaxi service for 250 employees (10% of its staff) in San Francisco using a fleet of 46 vehicles.
 March 2018 - A woman attempting to cross a street in Tempe, Arizona at night was struck and killed by an Uber vehicle while the onboard engineer was watching videos. Uber later restarted testing, but only during daylight hours and at slower speeds.
 August 2018 - Yandex began a trial with two vehicles in Innopolis, Russia
 December 2018 - Waymo started self-driving taxi service, dubbed Waymo One, in Arizona for paying customers.
 April 2019 - Pony.ai launched a pilot system covering  in Guangzhou for employees and invited affiliated, serving pre-defined pickup points.
 November 2019 - WeRide RoboTaxi began a pilot service with 20 vehicles in Guangzhou and Huangpu over an area of 
 November 2019 - Pony.ai started a three-month trial in Irvine, California with 10 cars and stops for pickup and drop off.
 April 2020 - Baidu opened its trial of 45 vehicles in Changsha to public users for free trips, serving 100 designated spots on a set  network. Services operation from 9:20am to 4:40pm with a safety-driver and a "navigator", allowing space for two passengers in the back.
 June 2020 - DiDi robotaxi service begins operation in Shanghai in an area that covers Shanghai's Automobile Exhibition Center, the local business districts, subway stations and hotels in the downtown area.
 August 2020. Baidu began offering free trips, with app bookings, on its trial in Cangzhou which serves 55 designated spots over pre-defined routes.
 December 2020. AutoX (which is backed by Alibaba Group) launched a non-public trial of driverless robotaxis in Shenzhen with 25 vehicles. The service was then opened to the public in January 2021.  
 February 2021 - Waymo One began limited robotaxi service in a number of suburbs of San Francisco for a selection of its own employees. In August 2021 the public was invited to apply to use service, with places limited.  A safety driver is present in each vehicles.  The number of vehicles involved has not been disclosed.
 May 2021 - Baidu commences a commercial robo taxi service with ten Apollo Go vehicles in a  area with eight pickup and drop-off stops, in Shougang Park in western Beijing
 July 2021 - Baidu opened a pilot program to the public in Guangzhou with a fleet of 30 sedans serving  in the Huangpu district.  200 designated spots are served between 9:30am and 11pm every day.
 July 2021 - DeepRoute.ai began a free of charge trial with 20 vehicles in downtown Shenzhen serving 100 pickup and dropoff locations.
 February 2022 - Cruise opened up its driverless cars in San Francisco to the public.
 February 2023 - Zoox, the self-driving startup owned by Amazon, carried passengers in its robotaxi for the first time in Foster City, California.

Notable commercial ventures

Uber ATG 
Uber began development of self-driving vehicles in early 2015. In September 2016, the company started a trial allowing a select group of users of its ride-hailing service in Pittsburgh to order robotaxis from a fleet of 14 modified Ford Fusions. The test extended to San Francisco with modified Volvo XC90s before being relocated to Tempe, Arizona in February 2017.

In March 2017, one of Uber's robotaxis crashed in self-driving mode in Arizona, which led the company to suspend its tests before resuming them a few days later.  In March 2018, Uber paused self-driving vehicle testing after the death of Elaine Herzberg in Tempe, Arizona, a pedestrian struck by an Uber vehicle while attempting to cross the street, while the onboard engineer was watching videos. Uber settled with the victim's family.

In January 2021, Uber sold its self driving division, Advanced Technologies Group (ATG), to Aurora Innovation for $4 billion while also investing $400 million into Aurora for a 26% ownership stake.

Waymo 
In early 2017, Waymo, the Google self-driving car project which became an independent company in 2016, started a large public robotaxi test in Phoenix using 100 and then 500 more Chrysler Pacifica Hybrid minivans provided by Fiat Chrysler Automobiles as part of a partnership between the two companies. Waymo also signed a deal with Lyft to collaborate on self-driving cars in May 2017. In November 2017, Waymo revealed it had begun to operate some of its automated vehicles in Arizona without a safety driver behind the wheel.
And in December 2018, Waymo started self-driving taxi service, dubbed Waymo One, in Arizona for paying customers.
By November 2019, the service was operating autonomous vehicles without a safety backup driver. The autonomous taxi service was operating in San Francisco as of 2021. In December 2022, the company applied for a permit to operating self-driving taxi rides in California without a human operator present as backup.

GM Cruise 
In January 2020, Cruise exhibited the Cruise Origin, a Level 4–5 driverless vehicle, intended to be used for a ride hailing service.

In February 2022, Cruise started driverless taxi service in San Francisco.
Also in February 2022, Cruise petitioned U.S. regulators (NHTSA) for permission to build and deploy a self-driving vehicle without human controls.
, the petition is pending.

In April 2022, their partner Honda unveiled its Level 4 mobility service partners to roll out in central Tokyo in the mid-2020s using the Cruise Origin.

Other developments 
Many automakers have announced their plans to develop robotaxis before 2025 and specific partnerships have been signed between automakers, technology providers and service operators. Most significant disclosed information include:
 The startup Zoox announcing in 2015 its ambition to build a robotaxi from scratch;
 Daimler AG teaming up with Bosch in 2017 to develop the software for a robotaxi service by 2025;
 The Renault-Nissan-Mitsubishi Alliance partnering with Transdev and DeNA to develop robotaxi services within 10 years from 2017;
 Didi Chuxing partnering with the Renault-Nissan-Mitsubishi Alliance and other automakers to explore the future launch of robotaxi services in China.
 BMW and Fiat Chrysler Automobiles partnering with Intel and Mobileye to develop robotaxis by 2021;
 Honda releasing in 2017 an autonomous concept car, NeuV, that aims at being a personal robotaxi;
 Baidu partnering with Nvidia to develop autonomous cars and robotaxis;
 Ford Motor's plan in 2017 to develop a robotaxi by 2021 through partnerships with several startups;
 Ford Motor investing $1 billion in the startup Argo AI to develop autonomous cars and robotaxis; the startup was later disbanded by Ford.
 Lyft and Ford partnering in 2017 to add Ford's self-driving cars to Lyft's ride-hailing network;.  Google leading a $1 billion investment in 2017 in Lyft which could support Waymo's robotaxi strategy. In 2021, Lyft's self-driving division was sold to Toyota.
 Delphi buying the startup NuTonomy for $400 million in 2017; 
 Parsons Corporation announcing a partnership with automated mobility operating system company Renovo.auto to deploy and scale AMoD services;

See also
 Shared autonomous vehicles, self driving passenger shuttle vehicles
 Self-driving car

References 

Automotive technologies
Emerging technologies
Robotics
Transport culture